Ganbold is a Mongolian patronymic and given name. As of 2012, it is in Mongolia, one of the 20 most common Mongolian names. Notable people with the name include:

People with Ganbold as a patronymic
 Badamsambuu Ganbold (born 1983), Mongolian born Japanese sumo wrestler, see Tokusegawa Masanao
 Batmönkhiin Ganbold (born 1991), Mongolian cross-country skier 
 Bilgüün Ganbold (born 1983), Mongolian footballer
 Davaadorjiin Ganbold (born 1957), Mongolian economist and politician
 Dogsomyn Ganbold, Mongolian politician
 Gandelger Ganbold (born 1995), Mongolian international footballer
 Ganbayar Ganbold (born 2000), Mongolian footballer
 Jambalyn Ganbold (born 1959), Mongolian judoka
 Munkhbolor Ganbold (born 1983), Mongolian contemporary artist
 Nyamdondovyn Ganbold (born 1973), Mongolian speed skater
 Tsedendambyn Ganbold, Mongolian cyclist

People with Ganbold as given name
 Ganbold Davaakhuugiin (born 1962), Mongolian literary historian and literary translator
 Ganbold Lundeg, Mongolian anesthetist
 Ganbold Bazarsad (born 1984), Mongolian born Japanese sumo wrestler, see Mōkonami Sakae

Gamboldyn is a similar name.